Devathayai Kanden is an Indian Tamil-language soap opera starring Ishwar, Krithika Laddu, Mahalakshmi . It started airing on Zee Tamil on 9 October 2017. The plot of the series is taken from a Telugu television series called Rama Seetha which aired on Zee Telugu from 2014 to 2017.

Plot
'Devathaiyai Kanden' is a Psychological thriller story that revolves around two protagonists - Vasudevan (Shreekumar/Ishwar) and Lakshmi (Shyamili Nayar/Krithika Laddu) with completely different mindset. Vasudevan is bought up by his grandfather who is a retired military major and is bound to follow very strict rules and regulations put forward by his grandfather (G. M. Kumar) due to various reasons. Lakshmi on the other hand is an independent lady who marries Vasudevan and wishes that her husband should love her the most than anyone else in this world. Knowing her wish Vasudevan gives her special love and affection. But his love slowly turns out to be a possessiveness without his own knowledge and it becomes grudgingly worrisome. At some point Lakshmi wishes that no woman should get such a husband and leaves him. How Lakshmi gets along with Vasudevan and over comes him and how Vasudevan's nature is changed forms the crux of the story.

Cast

Main
 Eshwar Raghunathan as Vasudevan
 Krithika Laddu as Lakshmi and Nallamma
 Mahalakshmi  as Pavithra

Recurring
 Sulakshana as Meenatchi (Vasudevan's mother)
 Rishi Keshav as Thennarasu (Pavithra's brother)
 Deepa Sree as Bharathi (Pavithra's worker)
 Sharanya as Kaviya (Vasudevan's sister)
 Subageetha as Sevappi (Nallamma's sister)
 Anusai Elakiya as Nila (Thennarasu assistant)
 Hema Chinraj as Sivagami (A goddess)
 Shyamili Nayar as Lakshmi and Nallamma (Replaced by Krithika) 
 Shreekumar as Vasudevan (Replaced by Eshwar) 
 Sheela as Meenatchi (Replaced by Sulakshana) 
 Ravi Varma as Lakshmi's father
 Bharatha Naidu as Oviya
 Maanas Chaavili as Raguram
 Vigneshwara Naidu as Vicky
 Ravi as Velu 
 Rehana as Rani
 Mani as Selvam
 Kiruthika as Kirthi
 Navin as Rajesh

Special appearance
 G. M. Kumar as Vasudevan's grandfather

Production

Casting
The series is a psychological thriller love story. Shreekumar, formerly of the series Naanal, Uravugal, Bommalattam, Anandham, Idhayam, Thayumanavan, Pillai Nila, Megala, Sivasakthi, Thalayanai Pookal and Yaaradi Nee Mohini, plays the lead male role of Vasudevan, Later Ishwar, formerly of the series Kalyana Parisu, Kalyanam Mudhal Kadhal Varai, Raja Rani and Gopurangal Saivathilai, was replaced the role of Vasudevan and Mahalakshmi, formerly of the series Bhairavi Aavigalukku Priyamanaval, Vani Rani, Chithi - 2, Ponnukku Thanga Manasu, Chellamey, Annakodiyum Aindhu Pengalum and Office, Plays the lead female negative role and  Shyamili Nayar, formerly of the serial Keladi Kanmani, Plays the female role of Lakshmi, Later Krithika Laddu, formerly of the series Poove Poochudava, Chandralekha, Ponnunjal and Hello Shyamala, was replaced the role of Lakshmi and Avan Ivan Tamil Film Fame G. M. Kumar was selected to portray the Special appearance of Vasdevan`s grandfather.

Reception
 Writer: A.K. Pandiyan
 Dialogues: Selva Vadivelu
 Director: Rathinam Vasudevan
 Editor: G. Parandhaman C.Vasanthakumar
 Co-Director: Rajkumar Nadarajan
 Assiant Director: Seenu, Navi Muthaiya
 Soundtrack: Arul
 Creative director: Abdulla

Awards and nominations

References

External links
 

Zee Tamil original programming
Tamil-language romance television series
Tamil-language thriller television series
Tamil-language television series based on Telugu-language television series
2017 Tamil-language television series debuts
Tamil-language television shows
2020 Tamil-language television series endings
Television shows set in Tamil Nadu